Pseudoperotis is a genus of beetles in the family Buprestidae, containing the following species:

 Pseudoperotis animosus (Kerremans, 1900)
 Pseudoperotis cyaneus (Obenberger, 1936)
 Pseudoperotis embriki (Obenberger, 1936)
 Pseudoperotis scabrosulus (Obenberger, 1924)
 Pseudoperotis subrugosus (Boheman, 1860)
 Pseudoperotis subviolaceus (Peringuey, 1886)

References

Buprestidae genera